Allison Russell is a Canadian singer-songwriter, musician and activist.

Prior to her solo music career, Russell performed as a member of various music groups including Po' Girl, Birds of Chicago, Our Native Daughters and Sisters of the Strawberry Moon. She released her first solo album, Outside Child, in 2021. The album was nominated for a 2022 Grammy Award in the Best Americana Album category, and the single "Nightflyer" was nominated for both the Best American Roots Performance (Russell) and Best American Roots Song (Russell and Jeremy Lindsay, co-writers).

In addition to her three Grammy nominations, Russell has been nominated for four Canadian Folk Music Awards, two Juno Awards and has been named to the long list for the Polaris Music Prize.

Early life and education 
Russell was born in Montreal to a Grenadian father and a Scottish-Canadian teenage single mother. Her mother struggled with postpartum depression and schizophrenia, and Russell was initially placed in foster care. Her mother regained custody of her after marrying a white-supremacist American expatriate. From the ages of 5 to 15, she was physically and sexually abused by her adoptive father. At the age of 15, Russell ran away from home, eventually moving to Vancouver in 1998. She attended Dawson College.

Career 
Russell was initially a member of the Vancouver-based Celtic folk band Fear of Drinking.

In 2003, Russell formed the band Po' Girl with The Be Good Tanyas member Trish Klein. She recorded seven albums with the band: Po' Girl (2003), Vagabond Lullabies (2004), B-side Recordings (2006), Home to You (2007), Deer in the Night (2008), Live(2009), and Follow Your Bliss (2010). Russell formed the music group Birds of Chicago with JT Nero in 2012. As part of Birds of Chicago, Russell released three studio albums, Birds of Chicago (2012), Real Midnight (2016) and Love in Wartime (2018). With the group, she also released a live album, Live from Space, and an EP titled American Flowers in 2018. In 2018, Russell joined the musical collective Our Native Daughters alongside fellow musicians Rhiannon Giddens, Leyla McCalla, and Amythyst Kiah. In 2019, the group released the album Songs of Our Native Daughters under the Smithsonian Folkways label. Russell was also featured alongside the rest of the group in a Smithsonian Channel documentary titled Reclaiming History: Our Native Daughters. As a single, Russell released covers of the songs "By Your Side" by Sade and "Landslide" by Fleetwood Mac in January 2021. She also released a cover of "Everything I Wanted" by Billie Eilish as a single in February 2021.

In March 2021, Russell released "Nightflyer" as the first single from her album Outside Child. She followed this up with the single "Persephone," released in April of the same year. She also released the singles "Montreal" and "The Runner" ahead of the album's full release.

On May 21, 2021, Russell released her first solo album Outside Child under Fantasy Records. The album explores her experiences during her youth, including her recovery from the trauma of her childhood abuse. For her work on the album, Russell was nominated for multiple awards, including four Canadian Folk Music Awards, the long list for the Polaris Music Prize, and a nomination for Emerging Act of the Year at the 2021 Americana Honors & Awards. She was nominated for this award both as a solo artist and in the duo/group category as a member of Our Native Daughters.

Russell performed her song "Nightflyer" with guests Brandi Carlile and Brittney Spencer on an episode of Jimmy Kimmel Live! aired on May 25, 2021. On May 28, 2021, Russell made her debut at the Grand Ole Opry. In the same year, she also performed at the Country Music Hall of Fame. She performed several songs from Outside Child live on CBS This Morning Saturday on July 24, 2021.

On September 25, 2021, Russell performed at the annual Farm Aid event in Hartford, Connecticut.

In November 2021, Russell received three Grammy nominations (Best American Roots Performance; Best American Roots Song; Best Americana Album). A month later, she was one of several artists to perform with the Black Opry, a revue focused on black artists in country music. On August 18, 2022, she and Brandi Carlile released a re-imagining of "You're Not Alone" which previously appeared on the Songs of Our Native Daughters album.

Personal life 
In 2013, Russell married her Birds of Chicago bandmate Jeremy Lindsay (stage name JT Nero). They were close friends and housemates. Russell gave birth to their daughter, Ida, in 2014.

Russell identifies as queer and stated in an interview that "I fall in the middle of the spectrum of orientation. I’ve been in love with women and I’ve been in love with men and I’ve been in love with trans people and I’ve been in love with non-binary people. I wound up falling in love and committing to share a life with a man, my husband. One could assume that I’m straight, but I am not and especially in this time of increased polarization and bigotry, it is really important that people understand that nothing is black and white. Nothing is simple and you can’t assume that because I am married to a man and I have a child that I am a straight person. You can’t say homophobic things to me and have it pass. Part of me wanted to really acknowledge that publicly". She stated that "Persephone", a song from her debut album, was written about her first love, a woman she met during her teenage years.

Discography 
Albums

Singles

Band 
Allison Russell - vocals, guitar, banjo, clarinet
Larissa Maestro - cello, backing vocals
Sista Strings (Monique and Chauntee Ross) - cello and violin, backing vocals
Joy Clark - acoustic guitar, backing vocals
Mandy Fer - electric guitar, backing vocals
Megan Coleman/Elizabeth Goodfellow - drums

Awards and nominations

References

External links
 
 
 

Living people
Canadian women folk singers
21st-century Black Canadian women singers
Year of birth missing (living people)
Canadian women singer-songwriters
Canadian folk singer-songwriters
Musicians from Montreal
Queer musicians
Canadian LGBT singers
Black Canadian LGBT people
Juno Award for Contemporary Roots Album of the Year winners
Dawson College alumni
21st-century Canadian LGBT people